The Luciopercinae is a subfamily of ray-finned fish, classified within the family Percidae, the subfamily includes the pike-perches and zingels. The pike-perches of the genus Sander have an Holarctic distribution while the zingels of the tribe Romanichthyini are found in Europe. They are largely freshwater species but some can be found in brackish water.

Characteristics
The species within the Luciopercinae have a number of morphological characteristics in common. These are the possession weak spines in the anal fin, the lateral line extends as far as the margin of the caudal fin and there are additional lines over and under the main lateral line, they have a cleithrum which does not have serrations on the pectoral girdle and they have a vertebrae count of 41–50.

Distribution
The Luciopercinae has a Holarctic distribution, the pike-perches of the genus Sander are found in Eurasia and North America and includes such commercially important species as the zander (Sander lucioperca) and the walleye (Sander vitreus). On the other hand the tribe Romanichthyini is restricted to Eastern Europe where the species within the tribe are all endemic to the fast flowing streams of the Danube drainage basin.

Systematics
The subfamily is classified into two tribes and three genera, as set out below, containing a total of 10 species:

 Tribe Luciopercini Jordan & Evermann 1896
 Genus Sander Oken, 1817
 Tribe Romanichthyini Dumitrescu, Bănărescu & Stoica 1957
 Genus Romanichthys Dumitrescu, Bănărescu & Stoica 1957
 Genus Zingel Cloquet, 1817

References

Percidae
Ray-finned fish subfamilies